The 1978 North Indian Ocean cyclone season had no bounds, but tropical cyclones in the North Indian Ocean tend to form between April and December, with peaks in May and November. The 1978 season produced five cyclonic storms of which developed into three severe cyclonic storms. All Five of the storms formed in the Bay of Bengal and four of those made landfall. The most notable storm of the season was Cyclone Four which hit Sri Lanka.



Season summary

Systems

Very Severe Cyclonic Storm BOB 01 (01B)

A depression formed in the northern Bay of Bengal on May 14 and move northward. The depression slowly strengthened into a cyclonic storm On May 15. The storm reached its maximum intensity of  before making landfall in Eastern Bangladesh on May 17 and dissipating thereafter. The effects from Cyclonic Storm One if any are unknown.

Cyclonic Storm BOB 09 (02B)

Another tropical depression formed in the Bay of Bengal on October 25 and moved northwestward. The depression became a cyclonic storm the following day The storm then turned to the northeast and then back to the northwest were its winds peaked at  before dissipating off the coast of Bangladesh on October 28.

Extremely Severe Cyclonic Storm BOB 10 (03B)

Super Cyclonic Storm BOB 11 (04B) 

The final tropical cyclone existed from November 19 to November 29. The 1978 Sri Lanka cyclone was the strongest tropical cyclone to strike Eastern province of Sri Lanka, making landfall on November 23.

See also

North Indian Ocean tropical cyclone
1978 Atlantic hurricane season
1978 Pacific hurricane season
1978 Pacific typhoon season
Australian cyclone seasons: 1978–79, 1979–80
South Pacific cyclone seasons: 1978–79, 1979–80
South-West Indian Ocean cyclone seasons: 1978–79, 1979–80

References

External links
India Meteorological Department